The BR Engineering BR01 is a Le Mans Prototype built by BR Engineering in 2015. The car made its debut at the 4 Hours of Imola run by SMP Racing.

Racing History

2015
In 2015 SMP originally planned a full-season program in the European Le Mans Series. After missing the first round, in which the team ran the Oreca 03, the car with its livery was unveiled at Imola. SMP Racing entered a pair of BR01s at the 24 Hours of Le Mans and a single prototype at the 6 Hours of Bahrain.

2016
SMP Racing entered the 2016 24 Hours of Daytona, ahead of their planned 2-car assault on the 2016 FIA World Endurance Championship season in 2016. Mikhail Aleshin took pole position in a wet qualifying session however the car fell back during the race, eventually finishing 38th overall.

2021

Four of the BR 01s are being raced in the Masters Endurance Legends. The car has claimed six class wins in the G2/P2 class so far, as of 13 June, as well as six overall podiums finishes.

References

External links

 SMP Racing

Le Mans Prototypes
24 Hours of Le Mans race cars